Barragon is a light corded cotton for summer wear.  It was particularly popular in the eighteenth and nineteenth centuries.

'Barragon coats' are referred to several times in the records of eighteenth century criminal trials in the Old Bailey, London, England.

References

Cotton